Tyrolean may refer to:
 Anything from Tyrol (state) (Austria), South Tyrol (Italy) or the  historical  County of Tyrol or region of Tyrol
 Tyrolean Zugspitze Cable Car
 Tyrolean Airways
 Tyrolean hat
 Tyrolean traverse, mountaineering manoeuvre
 Tyrolean Hound
 A type of cement render, applied by a hand-operated machine